The National Carillon is a large carillon situated on Queen Elizabeth II Island in Lake Burley Griffin, central Canberra, in the Australian Capital Territory, Australia. The carillon is managed and maintained by the National Capital Authority on behalf of the Commonwealth of Australia. It has 57 bells, ranging nearly 5 octaves from the  bass bell in F# to the  treble bell in D.

History 
The carillon was a gift from the British government to the people of Australia to commemorate the 50th anniversary of the national capital, Canberra. The structure was the subject of a limited competition between three selected Australian architects and three selected British architects. Assessors of the competition were Lord Holford, Sir Donald Gibson and Sir John Overall (Chairman of the National Capital Development Commission). The winners were the Western Australian firm of Cameron Chisholm Nicol. The carillon was designed in 1967, built during 1969 and completed in 1970. The three columns of the design symbolise the British and Australian governments and the City of Canberra. Queen Elizabeth II officially opened the National Carillon on 26 April 1970. The carillon has a symbolic value in the link between Britain and Australia. It also has some historic value for its association with the commemoration of the 50th jubilee of the founding of Canberra. The concept was developed in 1968 by Don Ho, an architect at Cameron Chisholm Nicol. The carillon bells and mechanism were designed and constructed by John Taylor & Co of Loughborough, England. 

The carillon is a good example of the late twentieth century Brutalist style. Its use of strong shapes which are boldly composed, the diagonal line of the roofs, large areas of blank wall, use of precast non load-bearing wall panels and strongly vertical windows and openings are all features of this style.

2019 upgrade 
In 2019, the carillon was upgraded with a new clavier, a fully replaced transmission and the addition of 2 new bells to add the lowest semitone and a new highest bell. The new lowest semitone bell was called the Ngunnawal bell, in recognition of the first peoples of the Canberra region. This bell weighs just over 5 tonnes and sounds the note G. The other bell added was a new lightest bell to extend the rage of the instrument to nearly 5 octaves. This work was carried out by John Taylor & Co.

The work was delayed by the onset of the COVID-19 pandemic.

Characteristics 
Carillons must have at least 23 bells to be considered as such, and the National Carillon has 57. It was initially installed with 53, and increased to 55 during refurbishments in 2003-2004. The bells span four and a half octaves chromatically. John Douglas Gordon, after whom the Queen Elizabeth II Island footbridge is now named, played the inaugural recital.

The carillon features moderate-size function facilities for small gatherings offering views over Lake Burley Griffin and central Canberra.

The carillon is in regular use, chiming every quarter-hour and playing a short tune on the hour along with tours and recitals on many days. For example, there is usually a recital of carols on Christmas Eve each year with music being played for around an hour at dusk. The best place to listen to the carillon is suggested to be within  of the building though the sound can usually be heard much further away in the Parliamentary Triangle, Kingston and Civic.

The quarter-hourly chimes of the National Carillon are reminiscent of those of Big Ben at London's Houses of Parliament.

Links to memorials 
The adjacent National Workers Memorial was constructed with the idea that people attending would hear the sound of bells from the carillon, which would assist them in remembering their loved ones.

Gallery

See also 

 List of carillons
 List of official openings by Elizabeth II in Australia
 Captain James Cook Memorial

References

Attribution

Bibliography

External links 

 

1970 establishments in Australia
Bell towers
Brutalist architecture in Australia
Buildings and structures in Canberra
Carillons
Commonwealth Heritage List places in the Australian Capital Territory
Landmarks in Canberra
Tourist attractions in Canberra
Towers completed in 1970
Towers in Australia